Jania may refer to:

 Jania (given name), a female given name, also spelled Janiya
 Jania (alga), J.V.Lamouroux, 1812, a coralline algae genus
 Jania Schult. & Schult.f., 1830, a plant genus, now considered a synonym of Moraea
 Jania, a 1996 album by Pakistani singer Ali Haider
 Jania, Barpeta district, a Satra holding village of Barpeta District, Assam, India
 Jania (Vidhan Sabha constituency), an assembly constituency of Assam Legislative Assembly in India
 Al-Janiya, Palestinian village on the occupied West Bank

See also